Athroolopha is a genus of moths in the family Geometridae.

Species
 Athroolopha chrysitaria (Geyer, 1831)
 Athroolopha pennigeraria (Hübner, 1813)

References
 Athroolopha at Markku Savela's Lepidoptera and Some Other Life Forms

Boarmiini
Geometridae genera